Qiziq, also spelled Qïzïq, Qyzyk, or Qyzyq, is an Oghuz tribe. The tribe mainly inhabits the provinces of Gaziantep, Kahramanmaraş, Bursa, Tokat, and Ankara in Turkey.

History
Qiziq was listed as one of the 24 Oghuz tribes in Jami' al-tawarikh by Rashid al-Din Hamadani but was included as a Khalaj tribe by Mahmud al-Kashgari. Carsten Niebuhr mentioned that Qiziqs dwelled around Aintab with 2000 tents in mid-18th century. Until the late 19th century, the tribe's region of settlement within the sanjak of Aintab fell within the nahiya of Qiziq, named after the tribe.

Culture
A folk dance called Qiziq halay is danced around Sivas, Tokat, and Yozgat in Central Anatolia.

Settlements
The tribe inhabits 22 villages in the northern portion of the province of Gaziantep and share several other villages with other tribes. Many of the old names of the Qiziq-inhabited villages bear the name of the tribe.

References

Ethnic groups in Turkey
Turkoman tribes
Turkish people